The  was a general army of the Imperial Japanese Army responsible for the defense of western Honshū, Kyūshū and Shikoku during the final stage of the Pacific War.

History
The Second General Army was established on April 8, 1945 with the dissolution of the General Defense Command into the First and Second General Army. Although its territory encompassed all of western Japan, its primary mission was to ensure the security of southern Kyūshū, which was regarded as the most probable target for invasion. Its forces consisted mostly of poorly trained reservists, conscripted students and home guard militia.

After the fall of Okinawa, the command of the Second General Army was relocated to Hiroshima. When the atomic bomb was dropped on Hiroshima, most of the military units, logistical arms, and command staff of the Second General Army were killed. Together with the Fifth Division, Fifty-Ninth Army, and other combat divisions in the city who were also hit, an estimated 20,000 Japanese combatants were killed.

Survivors regrouped at Ujina Air Base at the outskirts of Hiroshima, where they organized relief efforts and maintained public order in Hiroshima once martial law was proclaimed. However, the atomic bombing ended the Second General Army as an effective military organization for Imperial Japanese Army units in western Japan. Elements remained in place under the American occupation authorities until November 1945 to assist with the demobilization of Japanese troops.

Commanders

Commanding officer

Chief of Staff

See also
Armies of the Imperial Japanese Army

References

Books

External links

Army groups of Japan
Military units and formations established in 1945
Military units and formations disestablished in 1945
History of Hiroshima